Shun'ichi Kuryu (born 6 December 1958) is a Japanese police bureaucrat who served as Deputy Chief Cabinet Secretary in the First and Second Kishida Cabinet.

References 

Living people
1958 births
Japanese Police Bureau government officials
21st-century Japanese politicians
People from Tokyo
University of Tokyo alumni